Al-Quwaysimah (alternatively spelled Quwaysma or Qweismeh) is an area part of the Greater Amman Municipality, and also one of the districts  of Amman governorate. As of 2013 it had a population of 176,400, making it the fifth largest city in Jordan. In the 2015 census it was grouped with the localities of al-Jweideh, Abu Alandah and al-Rajib for a combined population of 296,273. In the 1915 Ottoman census it had a population of 101, all Muslims.

Climate
Al-Quwaysimah has a mediterranean climate (Köppen climate classification: Csa).

References

Populated places in Amman Governorate